Bakerton is an unincorporated community  in Jefferson County, West Virginia, United States.

References

Unincorporated communities in Jefferson County, West Virginia
Unincorporated communities in West Virginia